Daughter of Mine is an Italian drama film directed by Laura Bispuri. It premiered in the main competition at the 68th Berlin International Film Festival.

Cast
 Valeria Golino as Tina
 Alba Rohrwacher as Angelica
 Udo Kier as Bruno

References

External links
 
 

2018 films
2018 drama films
Italian drama films
2010s Italian-language films
2010s Italian films